Deák or Deak is a surname. Notable people with the surname include:

Deak Evgenikos, American actress originally from New Jersey
Edward Deak, the Roger M. Lynch Professor of Economics at Fairfield University in Fairfield, Connecticut
Ferenc Deák (politician) (1803–1876), Hungarian statesman and Minister of Justice
Ferenc Deák (footballer) (1922–1998), Hungarian football player
István Deák (1926–2023), Hungarian-born American historian, author and academic
Jon Deak (born 1943), Hungarian American double bassist and composer
László Deák (1891–1946), Hungarian army officer who served in World War I and World War II
Marcell Deák-Nagy (born 1992), Hungarian sprinter who specialises in the 200 and 400 metres
Nicholas Deak (1905–1985), Hungarian-American banker
Tamás Deák (composer) (born 1927), the composer and conductor for Cat City and Vízisí

See also
Deák Ferenc Bilingual High School
Deák Ferenc tér, major intersection and transport junction in Budapest
Deák Ferenc tér (Budapest Metro), the only transfer station for the M1, M2, and M3 lines of the Budapest Metro